"Oyato" (Yoruba: "I'm Different") is a song by Nigerian singer D'banj. It serves as the third single from the album D'Kings Men (2013), a collaboration between members of D'banj's label DB Records. It was produced by Jay Sleek. Mcomm, a Nigerian music distribution network, released the song on July 14, 2012. "Oyato" is D'banj's first Nigerian release as an independent recording artist since his departure from Mo' Hits Records. According to NotJustOk, the song "propelled the pop icon’s desire to reconnect with his numerous fans after the soar away success of his Oliver single in the UK."

D'banj's response to fans
D'banj thanked his fans for their support, saying, "Oyato is my special dedication to my fans who have stood by me through it all. Thank you for being there for me. The only way I can truly repay them is to keep on making great music that they will always enjoy and be proud of."

Critical reception
The aforementioned article gave the song a positive review, stating, "On the hugely anticipated single, not only does the Kokomaster prove his dexterity on his favourite instrument, the harmonica, he also sublimally reiterates the message his fans have never been in doubt of." Killa Kam of OkayAfrica said, "D’banj’s ”Oyato” features the usual Naija-pop suspects: synth melodies, heavy beat and, even, some of D’banj’s harmonica-playing — a talent he’s showcased before." Charles Mgbolu of Vanguard newspaper extensively added, "The song cast a stark picture of his recent travails. D’banj ran a chorus-verse1-chorus-verse2 pattern that abruptly winded down. There wasn’t that usual hooker that doubled as a bridge just after the second verse which helped threw his songs and everyone trapped within into splintering climax before its eventual closure."

Performance
D'banj performed "Oyato" to over 100,000 fans at the BBC 1 Hackney Weekend Music Festival.

Track listing
 Digital single

Audio release history

References

2012 singles
2012 songs
D'banj songs
Song recordings produced by Jay Sleek
Yoruba-language songs